Bléruais (Gallo: Bleruaz) is a commune in the Ille-et-Vilaine department in Brittany in northwestern France.

Geography
The River Meu forms most of the commune's northern boundary.

Population

The inhabitants of Bléruais are known as Bléruaisiens in French.

See also
Communes of the Ille-et-Vilaine department

References

External links

Mayors of Ille-et-Vilaine Association 

Communes of Ille-et-Vilaine